Rajiv Gandhi Polytechnic is located  in Udgir, in Latur district of Indian state of Maharashtra. The college was founded in 2009. The founder of the college is Bapurao Rathod.

References

Universities and colleges in Maharashtra
Polytechnics in Latur
Education in Latur
Educational institutions established in 2009
2009 establishments in Maharashtra